The British Rail Class 483 electric multiple units were originally built as 1938 tube stock units for London Underground. They were extensively refurbished between 1989 and 1992 by Eastleigh Works, for use on services on the Isle of Wight's Island Line. This was despite having already been used for nearly 50 years on the London Underground network. The units replaced the even older and life-expired British Rail Classes 485 and 486 units which were introduced in 1967, but were originally built as 'Standard' stock units for the London Electric Railway in 1923.

The trains were 83 years old when they were withdrawn in January 2021; they were the oldest passenger trains in Great Britain remaining in regular passenger service at the time. They were withdrawn on 3 January 2021, with the line closed from 4 January until 1 November 2021 for upgrade works, after which they were replaced by Class 484s. Of the six units present on the Island at the time of their withdrawal, all have been confirmed for preservation.

History

Prior to Isle of Wight service
The trains were originally built by Metro-Cammell as 1938 tube stock for London Underground. An initial batch was withdrawn from service in 1973, and they were considered for use on the Island Line (which would not bear that name for another 16 years). However, the under-floor equipment was thought to be a problem, as extensive adaptations would be needed to Ryde Works to allow fitters to access it. It was also felt that the under-floor equipment would be vulnerable to salt water damage on Ryde Pier, especially in bad weather.

The last batch of 1938 stock was withdrawn in 1985, except for five trains required on the Northern line between 1986 and May 1988 due to increasing passenger numbers. In 1987, Network SouthEast (NSE) managers realised that the existing 1923-built  trains would not be economically serviceable beyond around 1990 and thoughts turned to the future of the line. After closure of the route was discounted, it was decided to purchase and refurbish 1938 stock.

In April 1988, London Underground offered a total of 28 carriages in revenue-earning condition to NSE, joined by three further carriages in May 1989. In addition, between May 1988 and October 1990, four scrap vehicles and nine works vehicles, to be used for spare parts, were taken from LU's Ruislip depot. While the project's feasibility study suggested that three-car units would be preferred, it was thought that the alterations required to Ryde depot would be both difficult and expensive. It was instead decided that two-car units would be used, using a maximum of six coaches in any train formation. Of the 31 coaches available, 20 were selected for use on the island. These were extensively refurbished between 1989 and 1992 by Eastleigh Works to ready them for service on the line.

As well as cosmetic and structural work, significant electrical works were required both to replace dilapidated wiring, and to allow the trains to work from the line's third rail electrical supply.

Eight two-car units were initially refurbished between 1989 and 1990. These units were numbered 483001-008, although only the final three digits were carried on the cab ends. Units were painted in the new Network SouthEast livery, of blue with red and white stripes. The first unit was tested on the South West Main Line between Basingstoke and Eastleigh before travelling to Fratton ready for its transfer to the island. Testing and crew training on the remaining units took place on the Portsmouth Direct Line and Shepperton Branch Line.

On the island
The first unit, 001, arrived on the Isle of Wight on 5 July 1989 following an overnight ferry crossing from Portsmouth to Fishbourne. It was delivered by road to Sandown, then hauled to Ryde depot by one of the existing passenger trains. It began test running on the Island Line in the evening of 6 July, before a public launch on 13 July.  Regular passenger services using the Class 483 did not commence until October, while the last of the eight planned units did not enter service until July 1990.

While it was originally planned to use only eight units, in 1992—two years after the rest of the fleet had entered service—the ninth unit, numbered 009, was also refurbished and transported to the island. A 10th unit was also shipped to Ryde depot, although this was for spares only and was never used in passenger operation on the Island. This unit was unofficially given the unit number 483010.

Each unit was formed of two driving motor vehicles, numbered 121–129 and 221–229. The technical description of this formation was DMSO(A)+DMSO(B).

When the units were first introduced, the final digit of the unit number and the final digit of the carriage numbers corresponded, such that unit 001 was formed of vehicles 121 and 221. However, since then, a few rearrangements have taken place to the unit formations.

In 1996, with the privatisation of British Rail, the Ryde–Shanklin line became the Island Line franchise, which was won by the Stagecoach Group. Services continued to be branded as Island Line Trains. In 1999 three units (001, 003 and 005) were permanently withdrawn from service as surplus to requirements, leaving only six units remaining serviceable. In the early 2000s, the remaining units were overhauled and were repainted into a new livery of blue and yellow with pictures of dinosaurs. From 2007–2008, all units were repainted into their original London Transport red livery (albeit with yellow warning panels on the cab rather than the original red).

According to an article in the October 2005 issue of Rail Professional magazine, at that time Island Line was paying "an eye-watering £140,000 a year" to lease the trains, meaning that "[s]ince privatisation, HSBC Rail has pocketed over £1m for leasing these relics that are effectively worthless." In March 2007, South West Trains purchased the rolling stock outright from the leasing company HSBC Rail for £1.

Further that year, the Island Line franchise was amalgamated with South West Trains as part of the new South Western franchise.

Refurbishment
The Class 483 trains were last refurbished during 2007;
work on the six-vehicle fleet included:
 an exterior repaint into London Transport maroon with cream window pillars
 a retrim of the seat moquette into the same moquette that the London Underground A60/62 Stock received during their refurbishment between 1993–98
When South Western Railway took over the franchise in 2017, it launched a consultation on the future of Island Line services, revealing that only three of the six remaining units were serviceable.

Replacement

On 13 September 2019, South Western Railway announced that because of a "safety issue" only one of the units was able to run, which meant cancelling just under half of scheduled services and running only an hourly service on the Island Line. This reduction in service was by mid-September expected to last for approximately one month, until 14 October, but the company warned that the trains' age and increasing difficulty of getting spare parts meant it might take longer. Normal service was not restored for approximately 5 weeks, but further fleet faults brought repeated disruption through much of November. Just 3 days after the news that only one Class 483 was serviceable, on 16 September 2019 the government announced that the fleet would be replaced by five two-car Class 484s.

Preservation
The London Transport Traction Group was founded to facilitate the preservation of a Class 483 unit to run via an on-board power supply on the Epping Ongar Railway in Essex. On 24 November 2020, the group confirmed that it had been successful in securing a unit, probably 006 or 008. It was later announced that both 006 and 008 were going to be preserved by the group.

After problems relating to a lack of space at the Epping Ongar Railway, the London Transport Traction Group announced that Units 006 and 008 will instead be preserved at the Llanelli and Mynydd Mawr Railway, making 006 and 008 the first tube trains to be housed at a preserved railway in Wales.

It is also known that the Isle of Wight Steam Railway will be taking on unit 483007 Jess Harper which had gone under a 3 year overhaul, the last to be overhauled at Ryde traincare depot. It is planned, in the short term, for the unit to be displayed in the 'Train Story Discovery Centre'. It is hoped that in the years to come the unit will be able to run on its own power along the line.

On 29 July 2020, SWR, the owner and operator, announced that it was looking for new homes for the trains as soon as possible, to make room for the arrival of the first Class 484 units for testing later in the year. SWR had already received enquiries from preservation groups, including the adjacent Isle of Wight Steam Railway. Organisations expressing interest will need to demonstrate the capacity and financial security to remove and look after the train, as well as an appropriate long-term physical storage location.

Fleet details
Only two of nine units remained serviceable throughout most of 2020, the remainder having been taken out of service progressively since April 2000. On 29 July 2020 South Western Railway announced that the six extant units would be offered for preservation. Despite its impending withdrawal, unit 007 received a full overhaul, returning to service on 11 December 2020.

Gallery

Footnotes

References

Further reading

External links

483
Train-related introductions in 1989
Train-related introductions in 1938
Rail transport on the Isle of Wight